Jane Logemann is an American artist based in New York City, specializing in  abstract aesthetic featuring symmetry in nature and calligraphy-hebraic art.  She is a member of the American Abstract Artists (AAA) and her art is exhibited in a variety of public galleries including the Museum of Modern Art, the Walker Art Center, and the Contemporary Jewish Museum.

Education 
Logemann studied at the  Layton School of Art in Milwaukee, WI, and has a Bachelor of Science in Fine Arts from the University of Wisconsin–Milwaukee.

Presence in American museums 
 Rhode Island Landscape 1, 1984, Providence Athenaeum.
 Rhode Island Landscape 2, 1984, Providence Athenaeum.
 Untitled from American Abstract Artists Fiftieth Anniversary Print Portfolio 2, 1986, Walker Art Center, Minneapolis.
 Untitled, 1987, Harvard Art Museums.
 Untitled from American Abstract Artists 50th Anniversary Print Portfolio, 1987, The British Museum.
 Untitled from American Abstract Artists Fiftieth Anniversary Print Portfolio, 22 of 44 in the Portfolio, 1987, Whitney Museum of American Art.
 Abstraction, n.d., Yale University Art Gallery.
 Book of Glyphs, 1989, Yale University Art Gallery.
 Human - Hebrew, 1990, Yale University Art Gallery.
 Zone - Hebrew / Territory - Japanese, 1990, Yale University Art Gallery.
 A Hebraic-Arabic Alphabet, 1990–91, The Jewish Museum, NYC. 
 Theme – Tool Japanese [and] Violin Hebrew, 1991, Yale University Art Gallery.
 Friend - Hebrew II, 1994, Yale University Art Gallery.
 Water Japanese - Seaweed Hebrew, 1994, Yale University Art Gallery.
 Kaddish, first of a ten-part series, 1995, Yale University Art Gallery.
 American Abstract Artists 60th Anniversary Print Portfolio, 1997, Yale University Art Gallery.
 Letter-Hebrew from American Abstract Artists Sixtieth Anniversary Print Portfolio, 1997, Museum of Modern Art, NYC.
 Letter-Hebrew-1997 from American Abstract Artists Sixtieth Anniversary Print Portfolio, 20 of 40 in the Portfolio, 1997, Whitney Museum of American Art.
 Letter-Hebrew-1997, 1997, Harvard Art Museums.
 Black Landscape, 2000, Yale University Art Gallery.
 Kaddish 20, 2007, The Morgan Library & Museum.
 American Abstract Artists 75th Anniversary Print Portfolio, 2012, Yale University Art Gallery.

Solo exhibitions 
1972: Courtney Sale Gallery, Dallas, TX

1975: Everson Museum, Syracuse, NY

1984: American Landscape, The Sarah Doyle House, Brown University, Providence, RI

1988: Lenore Gray Gallery, Providence, RI

1989: Sandra Gering Gallery, NYC.

1995: Letters/Words: Jane Logemann, HUC Jewish Institute of Religion, NYC

1996: Jane Logemann: Kaddish and New Work, Philadelphia Museum of Judaism, Rodelph Shalom, Philadelphia, PA

New Work, Conde Gallery, NYC

1999: Kaddish & Recent Work, UJA Federation, NYC

2000: Kaddish and Alphabets, Curator: Isabel Wasserman, Gotthelf Gallery, JCC Jacobs Family Campus, LaJolla, CA

2001: Kaddish, Congregation Beth Shalon Rodfe Zedek, Chester, CT

2003: Abstraction & Language: A Dialogue, La Maison Francaise, The French Embassy, Washington D.C.

Further reading 
 Aishet Hayil. Yeshiva University Museum, NYC, 1993. 
 American Abstract Artists Journal, NYC, 2006. 
 American Artist on Exhibit, Art in Embassies. Exh. cat. Tbilisi, Georgia, 2000, Cover & p. 12, 13. 
 Calendar for Collecting for the 21st Century. The Jewish Museum, NYC. 
 Calendar for The Jewish Museum, NYC, 2004.
 Chevlowe, Susan. "Kaddish and Recent Work." UJA-Federation, NYC, 1999. 
 Collishean van Wagner, Judy. Lines of Vision: Drawings by Contemporary Women. New York: Hudson Hill Press, 1989. 
 Heresies Collective. Feminism & Ecology: Earthkeeping/Earthshaking. Vol. 4, No. 1, 1981. 
 Logemann, Jane. Abstracts Book I. Artist's book. 1975. 
 Logemann, Jane. Abstracts Book II. Artist's book. 1976. 
 Logemann, Jane. Abstracts Book III. Artist's book. 1979. 
 Metronom: Libres D'Artista/ Artist's Books. Barcelona, Spain, 1980, p. 86
 Price, Aimee Brown. "Abstraction & Language: A Dialogue." The French Embassy, Washington, D.C. 2003.
 Price, Aimee Brown. Diversity - N.Y. Artists. Exh. cat. Rhode Island: University of Rhode Island, 1985. 
 Richter, Elinor. The Art of Jane Logemann: A Meaningful Merger of Art and Abstraction. 2004. 
 Richter, Elinor. "Intersections: Reading the Space." The Jewish Museum of Australia Journal, Vol. 10, No. 1 (March, 2005). 
 Rush, Barbara. The Jewish Year: Celebrating the Holidays. New York: Stewart, Tabori & Chang, 2001. 
 The Rutgers Archives' Printmaking Studios, 1983, pp. 56–57.
 Soltes, Ori Z. Fixing the World: Jewish American Artists of the Twentieth Century. Hanover, NH: Brandeis University Press of New England, 2003.  
 Soltes, Ori Z. Jewish Artists on the Edge. Santa Fe, NM: Sherman Asher Publishing, 2001. 
 Soltes, Ori Z. Mysticism in Judaism, Christianity, and Islam. New York: Rowman & Littlefield, 2009.

References

1942 births
Living people
Artists from Milwaukee
University of Wisconsin–Milwaukee
Painters from Wisconsin
American abstract artists
20th-century American women artists
21st-century American women artists